Michael Dixon is a British conductor, musical director, musical supervisor, composer and arranger.  He is a 1979 graduate of Trinity College of Music.

Among other orchestras, he has conducted the Royal Philharmonic Orchestra and the BBC Concert Orchestra.  In 2004, together with the London Philharmonic Orchestra, he recorded Seven: A Suite for Orchestra by Tony Banks.

Theatre productions

Oh, What a Lovely War!
"Mrs Henderson Presents"
The Bodyguard
Taboo
Zorro
Never Forget
We Will Rock You
Footloose
Grease
Jesus Christ Superstar
Aspects of Love
Doctor Dolittle
Joseph and the Amazing Technicolor Dreamcoat
La Cage Aux Folles
Bernstein's Peter Pan
Bless the Bride
Mr Cinders
Andy Capp

Angela's Ashes

Television productions

BBC Radio 2 Day
12 Hours to Please Me
This is Lionel Richie
Text Santa
BBC Electric Proms
Concert for Diana
Eurovision Song Contest 1995 – conductor for the UK entry "Love City Groove"
Glastonbury 2007
MusiCool
Pop Idol
Royal Variety Performance
Miss World
British Comedy Awards
Party at the Palace
The Prince's Trust 30th Anniversary Concert
BBC Proms in the Park
An Audience with Jimmy Tarbuck
An Audience with Joan Rivers
Another Audience with Shirley Bassey
An Audience with Lionel Richie... Live!

References

External links
 MikeDixonMusic official website
 

British male conductors (music)
Alumni of Trinity College of Music
Eurovision Song Contest conductors
Living people
Year of birth missing (living people)
Helpmann Award winners
21st-century British conductors (music)
21st-century British male musicians